Harry Collett (born 2004) is a British actor. He began his career as a child actor on the West End. He went on to play Oliver Hide in the BBC medical drama Casualty (2016–2022), Tommy Stubbins in the film Dolittle (2020), and Jacaerys Velaryon in the HBO fantasy series House of the Dragon (2022).

Early life 
From Havering, Collett attended Coopers' Company and Coborn School for his secondary education, completing Year 11 in 2020.

Career 
Collett began his career in the West End productions of Billy Elliot the Musical at the Victoria Palace Theatre, Matilda The Musical at the Cambridge Theatre as Eric, and Elf at the Dominion Theatre as Michael.

Collett made his television debut in a 2014 episode of BBC medical drama Casualty as Seb Durante. That same year, he played a younger version of Michael Bublé in the music video for Bublé and Idina Menzel's cover of "Baby, It's Cold Outside". The following year, Collett made a guest appearance in the ABC musical comedy series Galavant as a younger version of the titular character (played by Joshua Sasse). He voiced lead character Wally in Wallykazam! across the first two series on Nick Jr. and Buzzbee in The Hive on CITV. 

In 2016, Collett was cast in another guest role on Casualty as Oliver Hide, the son of established character David Hide (Jason Durr) and debuted during the fifth episode of series 31. As part of the appearance, Collett filmed a stunt featuring his character trapped in a car engulfed in flames. He reprised the role in 2017 for three episodes, and again in 2019 for a longer stint. The actor returned for another stint in 2021. The following year in series 36, Collett reprised the role for four episodes, concluding with his character's death during a school shooting in episode thirty nine. Collett's co-star Durr praised the actor, calling him "absolutely fantastic" and opining, "He's got a great career ahead of him".

Collett made his film debut voicing a younger version of Luke Treadaway's character Raymond Briggs in Ethel & Ernest, an animated biographical film released in 2016. In 2017, Collett appeared in the short film Honour as 11-year-old boy Lee and had a cameo in Christopher Nolan's war film Dunkirk. The following year, he appeared in Dead in a Week or Your Money Back as a younger version of the character William.

In December 2017, it was announced Collett would star as apprentice Tommy Stubbins alongside Robert Downey Jr. in the adventure comedy film Dolittle, which would be released in January 2020. Collett was then cast as Prince Jacaerys "Jace" Velaryon in the 2022 HBO fantasy series House of the Dragon, a Game of Thrones prequel and adaptation of George R. R. Martin's companion book Fire and Blood.

Filmography

Stage

References

External links

Living people
2000s births
21st-century English male actors
English male child actors
English male film actors
English male musical theatre actors
English male stage actors
English male television actors
People from the London Borough of Havering
Year of birth missing (living people)